The Representative of Bermuda in London is the diplomatic mission of the British Overseas Territory of Bermuda in the United Kingdom. It is located in a multi-use office building in St James's. Unlike most diplomatic missions there is no flag or plaque indicating its existence, only a small label on the door-buzzer.

References

External links
 Official site

Bermuda
Foreign relations of Bermuda
Buildings and structures in the City of Westminster
St James's
Bermuda
British Overseas Territories–United Kingdom relations
United Kingdom–Caribbean relations